Gorny/Górny (masculine), Gornaya/Górna (feminine), or Gornoye/Górne (neuter) may refer to:

Places
Gorny District, a district of the Sakha Republic, Russia
Gorny (inhabited locality) (Gornaya, Gornoye), name of several inhabited localities in Russia
Gorny (air base)
Gorny Camp Directorate of Gulag

Other
Gorny (surname)
Gorny Institute, common name of the National Mineral Resources University

See also
 
Gorny Institute, a stratovolcano named after the university